Edward Keddar Nketiah (born 30 May 1999) is an English professional footballer who plays as a striker for  club Arsenal. Nketiah started his career with Arsenal and made his debut in 2017. He played on loan at Leeds United in their 2019–20 Championship title-winning season.

Early life and career
Edward Keddar Nketiah was born on 30 May 1999 in Lewisham, London to Ghanaian parents. He started his career with Chelsea after being scouted at the age of nine while playing for south-east London Sunday team Hillyfielders. He was released by Chelsea in 2015.

Club career

Arsenal

Early career

Nketiah joined the Arsenal Academy after leaving Chelsea and played for the club at youth levels. During the 2016–17 season, Nketiah scored 15 goals in 16 appearances for the under-18 team while also scoring 12 goals in 26 appearances for the under-23s. After that season, Nketiah was called up by Arsène Wenger for the first team's pre-season trip to Australia and China.

On 28 September 2017, Nketiah was called up to the first team for Arsenal's UEFA Europa League match against BATE Borisov. He came on as an 89th-minute substitute for Joe Willock as Arsenal won 4–2. His next appearance came nearly a month later against Norwich City in the EFL Cup as an 85th-minute substitute. He scored after 15 seconds with his first touch to tie the match, adding another in extra time to win it for Arsenal. Nketiah was set for a loan move to German Bundesliga club FC Augsburg in January 2019 transfer window, but due to an injury to Danny Welbeck, Nketiah stayed at Arsenal.

Nketiah scored his first goal in the Premier League on the last day of the season away to Burnley on 12 May 2019. He was an unused substitute in the UEFA Europa League final 4–1 defeat against Chelsea on 29 May, with him receiving a runners-up medal.

Loan to Leeds United
On 8 August 2019, Nketiah joined Championship club Leeds United on loan for the 2019–20 season. Leeds head coach Marcelo Bielsa described Nketiah upon signing as a "young, important player in English football". He made his debut for  13 August in the EFL Cup against Salford City, scoring his team's first goal during a 3–0 away victory. He scored on his Championship debut the following week, with the only goal in a 1–0 home win over Brentford.

After scoring his fourth goal of the season in Leeds' 2–0 win against Barnsley on 15 September 2019, Bielsa described Nketiah as a "complete player". After being behind Patrick Bamford in the pecking order, Marcelo Bielsa revealed Nketiah would have his chance to become the first-choice striker against Queens Park Rangers, however the day before the match Nketiah picked up a lower abdomen injury, which kept him out of action for one month. He returned from injury after one month out injured on 7 December, as a substitute in Leeds' 2–0 victory against Huddersfield Town.

His first league start for Leeds came on 29 December 2019, in a 5–4 victory over Birmingham City. Nketiah also started the next match on 1 January 2020, in what would prove to be his final appearance for Leeds away to West Bromwich Albion in a 1–1 draw. The result kept Leeds on top of the table on goal difference.

Return to Arsenal
Nketiah was recalled from his loan spell early by Arsenal on 1 January 2020. He was in the starting line-up in Arsenal's FA Cup fourth round victory against AFC Bournemouth on 27 January, and scored the second goal as Arsenal won 2–1 away. Nketiah made his first Premier League start at home to Newcastle United, before scoring in the next match against Everton, sliding a volley into the corner. He became a regular in Arsenal's return to league play after the hiatus caused by the COVID-19 pandemic, starting in the team's 3–0 loss away to Manchester City, being replaced in the 67th minute by Alexandre Lacazette. On 7 July, Nketiah received the first red card of his playing career, in a league game against Leicester City.

In July 2020, Nketiah picked up his first major medal of his career when Leeds United won the Championship title. The seventeen appearances Nketiah made on loan for the club earlier in the season were enough to be eligible for a winner's medal. Two weeks later, Nketiah lifted his first major trophy of his career with Arsenal, coming on as a substitute in the 82nd minute in the 2–1 victory over Chelsea in the 2020 FA Cup Final at Wembley Stadium.

2020–21 season
On 28 August 2020, Nketiah was in the starting line-up in the 2020 FA Community Shield at Wembley Stadium, where Arsenal beat Liverpool 5–4 in a penalty shoot-out after the match finished 1–1. On 19 September, he came on as a substitute in the 77th minute and scored the late winning goal in a 2–1 win against West Ham United in the Premier League. This was his first goal of the season.

Nketiah scored three times in the Europa League group stage, his goals coming in both games against Dundalk and the home game against Rapid Vienna. He finished the season with six goals in all competitions.

2021–22 season
Nketiah began the 2021–22 season as backup to Pierre-Emerick Aubameyang and Alexandre Lacazette. He scored in Arsenal's EFL Cup third and fourth round wins against AFC Wimbledon and Leeds United, respectively. On 21 December 2021, Nketiah scored the first hat-trick of his career with three goals in a 5–1 win against Sunderland in the EFL Cup quarter-final. 

Following Aubameyang's departure in February, Nketiah was given a regular place in the starting line-up towards the end of the season, and scored five goals in Arsenal's last seven Premier League matches. These included a brace against Chelsea in a 4–2 win at Stamford Bridge, another brace against Leeds, and Arsenal's second in a 5–1 win against Everton on the final day of the season. Nketiah ended the season with ten goals: five in the EFL Cup and five in the Premier League.

On 18 June 2022, Nketiah signed a new contract with Arsenal until June 2027.

2022–23 season
Despite Alexandre Lacazette leaving the club, Nketiah found himself back on the substitutes' bench following the signing of Gabriel Jesus. However, he started all six of Arsenal's Europa League group games and scored twice, in wins over Zürich and Bodø/Glimt, as Arsenal topped Group A. He made his 100th first-team appearance for Arsenal in their 3–0 win at Brentford on 18 September 2022.

He got a lengthy run in the team after Gabriel Jesus was ruled out for a few months after picking up a knee injury in Brazil's World Cup game against Cameroon. On 26 December, he made his first Premier League start of the season when the competition resumed following the 2022 FIFA World Cup, and scored in Arsenal's 3–1 win against West Ham. On 22 January 2023, he scored twice, including the match-winning goal in the last minute of Arsenal's 3–2 victory over Manchester United, to become the second Arsenal player to score a winner in the 90th minute against their rivals, after Thierry Henry in January 2007.

International career
Nketiah is eligible for both England and Ghana at international level. He made his international debut for England at under-19 level, playing a match against Saudi Arabia on 22 March 2017, in which he scored the second goal for England in the 58th minute as they won 2–0. In his next match, against Qatar, Nketiah scored three goals as England won 4–0. In November 2017, Nketiah scored four goals for the England under-19 team in a qualifier for the 2018 UEFA European Under-19 Championship against the Faroe Islands. He was one of a number of players withdrawn from selection for the tournament by their club.

Nketiah received his first call up to the England under-21 team for the 2018 Toulon Tournament. He scored twice in the semi-final against Scotland and provided the assist for Kieran Dowell to score the winning goal against Mexico in the final.

In January 2019, Nketiah reportedly turned down a call up from the Ghana national team, with Nketiah favouring England. In September 2020, Nketiah captained England under-21s for the first time and scored a hat-trick during a 6–0 victory over Kosovo.

On 7 October 2020, Nketiah equalled Alan Shearer's goalscoring record of 13 for the under-21s by scoring in a 3–3 draw against Andorra. Nketiah went on to break that record with the second goal of a 2–1 win over Turkey at Molineux Stadium on 13 October 2020; a victory that secured England's place at the 2021 UEFA European Under-21 Championship. Nketiah was ultimately named as England captain for that tournament, which ended with a group stage exit.

On 13 January 2023, Nketiah was belatedly recognised for his achievement in becoming England U21s' record goal scorer with the presentation of a commemorative golden boot by his former coach and The FA representative Michael Johnson.

Style of play
Nketiah is known for his pace and movement, his style has been compared to former Arsenal striker Ian Wright. In August 2019 he described Wright as his "mentor".

His playing style was also compared to Jermain Defoe, due to his movement to play off the last defender's shoulder and his sharp shooting ability from all angles. Nketiah can play as a striker or as a wide forward, with Nketiah describing his own playing style as "I'm a striker, I'm brave, I like to put myself in the places where the chances are going to fall."

Career statistics

Honours
Arsenal
FA Cup: 2019–20
FA Community Shield: 2020
UEFA Europa League runner-up: 2018–19

Leeds United
EFL Championship: 2019–20

England U21
Toulon Tournament: 2018

References

External links

Profile at the Arsenal F.C. website

1999 births
Living people
Footballers from Lewisham
English footballers
Association football forwards
Arsenal F.C. players
Leeds United F.C. players
Premier League players
English Football League players
FA Cup Final players
England youth international footballers
England under-21 international footballers
Black British sportsmen
English sportspeople of Ghanaian descent